Coulonces is a former commune in the Calvados department in the Normandy region in northwestern France. On 1 January 2016, it was merged into the new commune of Vire Normandie.

Geography 
Located on the banks of the Brévogne, it is a typical village of the Bocage Virois. The village is 4 km southwest of La Graverie, 5 km northwest of Vire, and 12 km east of Saint-Sever-Calvados. The highest point (196 m) is located in the south-western area, and the lowest point (84 m) is in the northeast.

Population

See also
Communes of the Calvados department

References

Former communes of Calvados (department)
Calvados communes articles needing translation from French Wikipedia
Populated places disestablished in 2016